Pedro Sebastián Larrea Arellano (born May 21, 1986 in Loja) is an Ecuadorian footballer. He plays for Libertad F.C..

Club career
Larrea has always played for L.D.U. Quito. He plays as a central midfielder and was often used as a starter whenever Patricio Urrutia can't play. He played in the 2008 Copa Sudamericana as a replacement for Urrutia against Boca Juniors. Liga went on to lose to them 5-1 aggregate.

In the 2008 FIFA Club World Cup, Larrea made two substitute appearances. In the semi-final encounter with Pachuca, he came on in the last two minutes of the game. He provided an assist for Reinaldo Navia but Navia could not score the goal. He also came on in the last minutes of the final.

In 2009, Larrea began having a more starting role in the squad. He scored his first goal in a 1–1 tie against Emelec in the Ecuadorian Copa Credife. The impressive goal was made from 30 meters out and was named the goal of the week by Ecuadorian newspaper El Comercio.

On January 21, 2016 it was confirmed that Larrea would be joining El Nacional.

International career
Larrea made his first appearance for the Ecuador national football team in a friendly 1-0 loss to the USA in May 2016.

Titles
L.D.U. Quito
Serie A: 2003, 2005 Apertura, 2007
Copa Libertadores: 2008
Recopa Sudamericana: 2009
Copa Sudamericana: 2009

References

External links
Larrea's FEF player card 

1986 births
Living people
People from Loja, Ecuador
Association football midfielders
Ecuadorian footballers
Ecuador international footballers
L.D.U. Quito footballers
C.S.D. Macará footballers
Barcelona S.C. footballers
L.D.U. Loja footballers
C.D. El Nacional footballers
C.D. Cuenca footballers
2015 Copa América players
Copa América Centenario players